Avenue B is a north–south avenue located in the Alphabet City area of the East Village neighborhood of Manhattan, New York City, east of Avenue A and west of Avenue C. It runs from Houston Street to 14th Street, where it continues into a loop road in Stuyvesant Town, to be connected with Avenue A. Below Houston Street, Avenue B continues as Clinton Street to South Street. It is the eastern border of Tompkins Square Park.

History
The city reasoned that the lettered avenues were "incapable of use as thoroughfares to and from the City" and could not "be considered as avenues in the proper Sense of the term."

East End Avenue
On the Upper East Side, Avenue B reappears as East End Avenue; principally residential in character, it runs only from East 79th Street to East 90th Street through the Yorkville neighborhood. It was called Avenue B under the original Commissioners' Plan of 1811, but is no longer given that designation. Carl Schurz Park, the location of Gracie Mansion, is adjacent to the avenue at this point. In 1928, the New York City Board of Estimate ruled that development below East 84th Street was restricted to residential use.

Landmarks
 The Christodora House, a former women's Settlement House and now a condominium, is located on Avenue B at 9th Street.
 The Charlie Parker Residence at 151 Avenue B between 9th and 10th Streets, where jazz musician Charlie "Bird" Parker lived from 1950 to 1954, is a New York City landmark.
 Gracie Mansion, a New York City landmark and official residence of the mayor of New York City, is located on East End Avenue at 88th Street.

Transportation
Currently, there is no bus that travels on Avenue B. The M9 bus formerly used this street from East Houston Street to 14th Street. The M9 now travels on Avenue C from Houston to 23rd Streets. The M79 bus travels along East End Avenue from 80th Street to 79th Street.

In popular culture
 In 1922 Fanny Brice recorded "The Sheik of Avenue B", a parody of "The Sheik of Araby" written by Harry Ruby and Bert Kalmar
 In Jonathan Larson's musical Rent, most of the characters live on Avenue B and 11th Street
 In 1983 Pierce Turner, Larry Kirwan and Thomas Hamlin wrote "Avenue B (is the place to be)", which was recorded by their band Major Thinkers
 A 1999 Iggy Pop album is entitled Avenue B, written while he was living at Christodora House
 A song by The Fleshtones entitled Take a Walk with the Fleshtones on their album Beautiful Light describes the street scene, starting at "Eleven Eleven" with the chorus repeating "...on Avenue B"
 Gogol Bordello wrote a song called "Avenue B"
 Several scenes from the 1986 film "Crocodile Dundee" were filmed in and around a bar located at 108 Avenue B where that street intersects with East 7th Street, otherwise known as Tompkins Square.
 On Lou Reed's 1989 album New York, the song "Halloween Parade" includes the line "The boys from Avenue B, the girls from Avenue D, a Tinkerbell in tights." The song is about the ravages of AIDS, using the Greenwich Village Halloween Parade as a backdrop.
 On Cop Shoot Cop's 1994 Release, the song "It Only Hurts When I Breathe" references the corner of Avenue B and 3rd Street.

References
Notes

External links

 New York Songlines: Avenue B, a virtual walking tour

B